Piecing Me Together is a 2017 young adult novel by Renée Watson. The first person novel tells the story of Jade, an ambitious African American high school student. The book, a New York Times best seller, was well reviewed and won several awards.

Plot 
Jade, who is also the book's narrator, is a sixteen-year-old African American student attending a mostly white private school in Portland, Oregon on a scholarship. Jade is from a poor neighborhood and is different from the rest of her school. Heeding her mother's advice, Jade works to take advantage of every opportunity presented to her. Hoping to be afforded the opportunity to study abroad so she can utilize her fluent Spanish Skills, Jade is instead offered the chance to be paired with a mentor in the Women to Women program by her school's guidance counselor. Paired with Maxine, Jade initially has high hopes for this mentor-ship, hopes which are dashed when Maxine proves unreliable and Jade begins to wonder if it is she or Maxine who is getting more out of the program. Through her art, Jade begins to act on the realization that she needs to make her own opportunities.

Reception and awards 
Piecing Me Together received starred reviews from The Bulletin of the Center for Children's Books, Kirkus Reviews, Publishers Weekly, and School Library Journal, as well as positive reviews from Booklist.

Kirkus, School Library Journal, NPR, New York Public Library, and Chicago Public Library named it one of the best books of 2017.

It was named to the Bank Street Children's Book Committee's 2018 Best Books of the Year List with an "Outstanding Merit" distinction and won the Committee's Josette Frank Award for fiction.

References

2017 children's books
Newbery Honor-winning works
Coretta Scott King Award-winning works
Novels set in Portland, Oregon
Bloomsbury Publishing books
African-American young adult novels
Literature by African-American women
African-American history of Oregon